The SPYDER ("Surface-to-air Python and Derby") is an Israeli short and medium range mobile air defence system developed by Rafael Advanced Defense Systems with assistance from Israel Aerospace Industries (IAI). Rafael is the prime contractor and IAI is the major subcontractor for the SPYDER program. This system achieved a notable milestone in 2005 when missiles were fired against test targets in Shdema, Israel and scored direct hits. Since then, it has been showcased in multiple military exhibitions throughout the world.

The SPYDER is a low-level, quick-reaction surface-to-air missile system capable of engaging aircraft, helicopters, unmanned air vehicles, drones, cruise missiles and precision-guided munitions. It provides air defence for fixed assets and for point and area defence for mobile forces in combat areas. The system is fitted atop a Tatra truck, a Mercedes-Benz Actros truck, a MAN TGS truck, Scania P-series truck, Dongfeng truck, or a TELAR. It implements the Python-5 and Derby missiles of the same company. The SPYDER launcher is designed to fire Python-5 and Derby surface-to-air missiles which share full commonality with the air-to-air missiles. There are two variants of the SPYDER: the SPYDER-SR (short range) and the SPYDER-MR (medium range). Both systems are quick reaction, all weather, network-centric, multi-launchers, and self-propelled. A typical battery consists one central command and control unit, six missile firing units, and a resupply vehicle. The SPYDER-SR uses the EL/M-2106 ATAR radar while the SPYDER-MR incorporates the EL/M-2084 MMR radar. The latter is the same radar used by the Iron Dome system currently in service with the Israel Defense Forces.

Current operators of the SPYDER missiles system include India and Singapore. Peru's order for the SPYDER was pending as of 2012. There are reports that claim that Georgia operated the SPYDER-SR during the 2008 Russo-Georgian War but these allegations and assumptions have never been verified.

Development
In 2005, a milestone for the SPYDER air defence system was achieved. The SPYDER successfully fired the Python 5 and Derby in a test range located in Shdema, Israel. The results were two direct kills against a couple of targets. At the trial, the radar and command and control unit engaged the targets at long and short ranges. The trial was part of a greater series of missile firings.

Exhibitions
The SPYDER air defence system has been showcased in 29 military exhibitions throughout the world. These exhibitions are:

Description

Command and control

EL/M-2106 ATAR

The Elta EL/M-2106 Advanced Tactical Acquisition Radar (ATAR) 3D Active electronically scanned array (AESA) surveillance radar is the Command and Control Unit (CCU) for the SPYDER-SR. This radar can track and engage multiple targets simultaneously and can control the missile firing units at a distance of up to 10 km away from the CCU. The E/LM-2106 ATAR is a fourth generation defence radar designed by Elta and operates in the L-band wavelength. It is a field proven design that has operated in undesirable environments according to the designers and manufacturers. The range of detection for a fighter aircraft is 70–110 km. It can detect hovering helicopters at a range of 40 km and UAVs at 40–60 km.

EL/M-2084 MMR

The radar sensor unit of the SPYDER-MR comprises the EL/M-2084 Multi Mission Radar (MMR) 3D AESA radar. The EL/M-2084 operates in the S-band. It can process up to 1200 targets when in air surveillance mode and also detects targets located 250 km away. When the radar is static, it covers 120° in the azimuth.

Surface-to-air missiles

Ranges of Interception
As a short range air defence system, the SPYDER-SR has a short range of interception. The maximum altitude of interception is 9 km and the maximum range of interception is 15 km. The SPYDER-MR has a greater operation range of 35 km and an altitude engagement of 16 km due to the missiles being equipped with boosters.

Python-5
The Python-5 is currently the most capable air-to-air missile (AAM) in Israel's inventory and one of the most advanced AAMs in the world. As a beyond-visual-range missile, it is capable of "lock-on after launch" (LOAL), and has all-aspect/all-direction (including rearward) attack ability. The missile features an advanced electro-optical infrared homing (with imaging infrared) seeker which scans the target area for hostile aircraft, then locks-on for terminal chase.

Derby
The Derby is an active radar homing AAM that provides the SPYDER missile system with a fire-and-forget option due to its active radar guidance.

In January 2023, Rafael announced that they had upgraded the Spyder to be able to counter tactical ballistic missiles by performing hardware and software upgrades to the Derby LR missile interceptor.

Variants

SPYDER-SR and SPYDER-ER 360° slant launching missile systems provide quick reaction, lock-on-before-launch (LOBL) and lock-on-after launch (LOAL) capabilities, while extending the range of defense to up to a 40 km radius.

SPYDER-MR and SPYDER-LR offer medium & long range target interception through vertical launch while pushing the defense envelope up to an 80 km radius.

Both systems enable a 360° launch within seconds of the target being declared hostile ‒ and provide all-weather, multi-launch, and net-centric capabilities.

The SPYDER systems have advanced ECCM capabilities and use electro-optical observation payloads as well as wireless data link communication.

Operational use

 During the Russo-Georgian War of 2008, it was believed that Georgia operated the SPYDER-SR. The Georgian air force could have operated up to four launchers of the SPYDER-SR.
 On 26 February 2019, after the  Balakot Airstrike, India used a SPYDER system to shoot down a surveillance drone of the Pakistan Armed Forces at the Indo-Pakistan Border at Gujarat.
 On 27 February 2019, during the 2019 Jammu and Kashmir airstrikes, Indian SPYDER system shot down an Indian Air Force (IAF) Mil Mi-17 in Budgam, Kashmir. All six IAF personnel on board the helicopter and one civilian on the ground were killed. After 6 months of investigation, IAF confirmed that shooting down of Mi-17 was a friendly fire and 5 IAF personnel were held guilty.

Operators

Current operators

 In 2012, Azerbaijan and Israel signed a $1.6 billion contract to supply unknown quantity of Spyder and Barak-8 SAM to Azerbaijan.

Czech Armed Forces – On 25 September 2020, the Czech Ministry of Defense announced that it would begin negotiations with the Israeli government on the acquisition of SPYDER. Rafael said in a 27 September press release that the Czech MoD informed the Israeli MoD’s Directorate of International Defense Cooperation of the decision “[f]ollowing an international tender process, which lasted several years”. The Czech MoD reported that Minister of Defense Lubomír Metnar informed his government that his ministry had decided to begin negotiations with the Israeli government “on the possibility of acquiring a new modern anti-aircraft missile system for the Czech Army … designed to ensure the continuous defense of the airspace of the Czech Republic, especially the protection of troops and urban agglomerations, nuclear power plants, industrial centres, airports and other important facilities.” The SPYDER-MR deal was valued at around $430 million. With deliveries expected in 2023, the SPYDER-MR would replace ageing Soviet-era 2K12 Kub systems, in use by the Czech army since the 1970s. The Czech government announced on 27 September 2021 that it has signed an agreement to purchase four SPYDER batteries. The Czech Ministry of Defense said that the value of the deal was $627 million, and that delivery of the systems was scheduled to be completed by 2026. Under the contract, the Czech defense industry would take part in the program, supplying products and services worth more than 30 percent of its value. The Czech Army was expected to operate the supplied systems for at least 20 years. Combined with spending for maintenance and repairs, the acquisition would cost the country about $1 billion, according to the statement. On 5 October 2021, it was reported that the Israeli Defense Ministry has signed the agreement, worth approximately $520m (ILS2bn). The deal was signed under the guidance of SIBAT, the International Defense Cooperation Directorate of the Ministry. The agreement was signed by IMoD Director-General major general Amir Eshel and Czech Republic Armaments and Acquisition Deputy Minister Lubor Koudelka. Eshel said: “The agreement that we signed today is yet another milestone in the strategic cooperation between our two countries and also reflects the visions of both Ministers Gantz and Metnar to further develop cooperation between Israeli and Czech industries. “This is the first time that Israel will deliver a full air defence system to a NATO country, and we are proud and thrilled that the Czech Republic is the one.”

Ethiopian Air Force bought the SPYDER-MR air defense system to protect the Grand Ethiopian Renaissance Dam from possible air strikes. The amount is not exactly reported but sources have confirmed it is in Ethiopia. The Arab Weekly reported in 2019. The African Intelligence also reported on the SAM systems arriving to the Grand Ethiopian Renaissance Dam. Debka also reported on the SPYDER-MR air defense systems arriving in Ethiopia.

Defense Forces of Georgia – There were reports that a battery of the SPYDER missile system was operated in 2008. No official confirmation exists and the Stockholm International Peace Research Institute (SIPRI) arms transfer database cannot confirm this. Jane's Missiles & Rockets magazine previously cited a Rafael representative claiming that one of the two export customers of the SPYDER missile system already has theirs deployed.

Indian Air Force – In 2006, India planned to acquire 18 SPYDER-MR systems at a cost of $395.2 million (₹1,800 crore) for its air force. The contract was reviewed by the Central Vigilance Commission, the Government’s anti-corruption agency, before the agreement was signed in September 2008. In August 2009, the multibillion-dollar contract for Israeli anti-aircraft missiles was cleared by the Defence Acquisition Council headed by defence minister AK Antony. Although previous estimates of the contract's value was ₹1,800 crore ($395.2 million), recent reports indicate a lower value of $260 million. The Jerusalem Post contradicts these figures and mentions a price of $1 billion for the purchase of the surface-to-air missiles. The SPYDER systems were delivered starting in 2012. 18 SPYDER-MRs along with 750 Python-5 surface to air missiles (SAMs) and 750 Derby SAMs has been delivered.

Peruvian Armed Forces – In March 2012, Peru chose the winners of a $140 million competition meant to upgrade its ageing air defence systems out of the group of 20 defence companies. Amidst the presence of Russia's Rosoboronexport and Chinese firms, the winners were Poland's Bumar Group, Israel's Rafael Advanced Defence Systems, and the USA's Northrop Grumman. Rafael industries is expected to supply six SPYDER-SR systems in this deal. Status of the deal in unclear.

Philippine Air Force - Three batteries of the SPYDER-MR air defense system were purchased in a deal said to be worth over $141 million. Two batteries called SPYDER Philippine Air Defense System (SPADS) were formally inducted into service in November 2022. The last battery is expected to be delivered in 2023.

Republic of Singapore Air Force –  In 2008, the Ministry of Defence ordered two SPYDER-SR batteries along with 75 Python-5 SAMs and 75 Derby SAMs. They were all delivered during 2011 and 2012. Some SPYDER-SRs were operated by the 165 Squadron in 2011, it is also reported that more SPYDER-SRs are on order. The RSAF SPYDER is mounted on MAN RMMV TG-MIL trucks. The SPYDER system achieved full operational capacity on 4 July 2018.

 VPA Air Defence – In 2015, Vietnam chose the SPYDER missile system as its new medium-range air defense missile system. First deliveries were highlighted in July 2016. Vietnamese systems are mounted on RMMV HX range trucks. Five systems including 375 Python missiles and 375 Derby missiles were reportedly acquired.

 United Arab Emirates Armed Forces – In 2022, the United Arab Emirates bought an undisclosed number of SPYDER missile systems.

 Royal Moroccan Armed Forces – Morocco signed a contract to buy SPYDER from Israel.

See also
Iron Dome
Arrow (Israeli missile)
Barak 1
David's Sling

References

Notes

Citations

External links

Rafael Advanced Defense Systems Ltd.
PYTHON-5 by Rafael
DERBY by Rafael

Fact Sheet: Surface-to-Air PYthon-5 and DERby - Air Defence System (SPYDER)
Israel Aerospace Industries
ELM-2106 ATAR by Elta
ELM-2084 - MMR by Elta
Spyder Family - (SR/ER/MR/LR) by Rafael

Rafael Advanced Defense Systems
Elta products
Surface-to-air missiles of Israel
Military equipment introduced in the 2000s